Lamberhurst Quarter is a hamlet on the A21 road, in the English county of Kent. It is near the village of Lamberhurst.


References 
 http://getamap.ordnancesurvey.co.uk/getamap/frames.htm (result for Lamberhurst Quarter)

Hamlets in Kent